Oleksandr Fraze-Frazenko (Ukrainian: Олександр Фразе-Фразенко, *June 16, 1989) is a Ukrainian poet, filmmaker, photographer, translator, and musician. He is a co-founder of "OFF Laboratory" production company. Born in Lviv, Ukraine, Frazenko is known for his documentaries about Ukrainian artists. He is an author of includes several hundred films and music videos.

Films 
The first feature film "Don't lie to me" was presented in 2016 at Wiz-Art Lviv International Short Film Festival.

Known for his feature documentaries about Ukrainian artists, including poets ("Chubai" in 2014, "The House on Seven Winds" in 2015, "An Aquarium in the Sea" in 2016).
"It's not just a documentary. It is also a feature film, which combines documentary aspect with the artistic vision of the director, making it
a unique film."
George G. Grabowicz (Professor at Harvard University) about "An Aquarium in the Sea".

Literature 
Is an author of several poetry books: 
 “The Story of a Killer” (2007), 
 “First. Middle. Last” (2008), 
 “Twilight House” (2009), 
 “Mass” (2010), 
 “The days of Loss” (2014), 
 “The Hole. Short selected” (2015), 
 “Nota Tirona” (2015). 

He is a translator of the first poetry book of Jim Morrison published in Ukrainian. He also translates English poetry of the Restoration Period including works of John Wilmot Rochester. Frazenko is an author of two books that have been adapted as scripts for his films: "An Aquarium in the Sea" and "The House on Seven Winds" translated by Olga Gerasymiv and published by Harvard Book Store.

Music 
Plays improvisational music and indie-rock. Discography consists of more than 50 albums. Collaborates with Yuriy Yaremchuk, Julian Kytasty, Mark Tokar, Olesya Zdorovetska, and others.

Links 

 Oleksandr Fraze-Frazenko Official Chanel // YouTube
 The Brattle Theatre Special Film Screening
 Poetry reading in Chicago
 http://litakcent.com/2015/05/15/komentari-do-chasiv-vtrat-oleksandra-fraze-frazenka-dali-bude/

Living people
Year of birth missing (living people)